Mohammed Abu Zafar (born 1 March 1963) is a Bangladeshi civil servant and career diplomat. He is the Incumbent Ambassador of Bangladesh to Austria and permanent representative to the UN offices or intergovernmental organizations in Vienna.

Early life
Zafar was born on 1 March 1963 of the then East Pakistan (now Bangladesh). He obtained his BSc from Sher-e-Bangla Agricultural University in Agriculture and Postgraduate diploma in International relations from École nationale de la France d'Outre-Mer (IIAP) in Paris, France. He completed his MBA from Preston University.

Career
Zafar served at Bangladesh Jute Research Institute as a Scientific Officer from July 1987 to November 1989. He also served at the Ministry of Post and Telecommunication as an Assistant Postmaster General from December 1990 to November 1991. He joined the Bangladeshi Foreign Service in 1991.

References

1963 births
Living people
Bangladeshi diplomats
Sher-e-Bangla Agricultural University alumni